Jiangxi is a southeastern province of China.  The area's musical heritage includes the Hakka music of Jiangzi, Fujian and Guangdong.  Hakka music is literary and laid-back in tone, and consists entirely of five notes; many folk songs only use three notes.

Jiangxi's opera heritage is also important, having played a major role in the evolution of Beijing opera.

Jiangxi
Culture in Jiangxi